Rita Bludau ( Schmidt and then Schmidt-Köppen; born 27 January 1942) is a retired German rower and successful rowing coach.

As Rita Schmidt, she who won three gold and one silver medals in the double scull at the European championships between 1968 and 1971, together with Gisela Jäger. She also won a bronze medal in this event at the 1974 World Championships, together with Gisela Medefindt.

As Rita Bludau, she was one of the most successful rowing coaches in East Germany. Working at SC Berlin, she coached Jana Sorgers, Jutta Behrendt and Sybille Schmidt to Olympic gold or world championship titles.

References

External links
 

1942 births
Living people
East German female rowers
World Rowing Championships medalists for East Germany
European Rowing Championships medalists